Darreh Khoshk may refer to:
 Darreh Khoshk, Izeh, Khuzestan Province
 Darreh Khoshk, Ramhormoz, Khuzestan Province
 Darreh Khoshk-e Hatemvand, Khuzestan Province
 Darreh Khoshk-e Jafarvand, Khuzestan Province
 Darreh Khoshk, Kohgiluyeh and Boyer-Ahmad